Samar Amer Ibrahim Hamza (born 4 April 1995) is an Egyptian freestyle wrestler. She won the silver medal in the women's 76kg event at the 2022 World Wrestling Championships held in Belgrade, Serbia. She became the first woman representing Egypt to reach a final at the World Wrestling Championships.

She competed at the 2016 Summer Olympics in Rio de Janeiro, Brazil, and the 2020 Summer Olympics in Tokyo, Japan.

Career 

In 2016, she competed in the women's freestyle 75 kg event at the 2016 Summer Olympics, in which she was eliminated in the round of 32 by Ekaterina Bukina.

In 2021, she won the silver medal in the 76 kg event at the Matteo Pellicone Ranking Series 2021 held in Rome, Italy. She qualified at the 2021 African & Oceania Wrestling Olympic Qualification Tournament to represent Egypt at the 2020 Summer Olympics in Tokyo, Japan. She competed in the women's freestyle 76 kg event. She won one of the bronze medals in the women's 76 kg event at the 2021 World Wrestling Championships held in Oslo, Norway.

In 2022, she competed in the women's 76 kg event at the Yasar Dogu Tournament held in Istanbul, Turkey. She won the gold medal in her event at the 2022 African Wrestling Championships held in El Jadida, Morocco. She won one of the bronze medals in the 76 kg event at the 2022 Mediterranean Games held in Oran, Algeria. She won the bronze medal in her event at the 2022 Tunis Ranking Series event held in Tunis, Tunisia. She won the silver medal in the women's 76kg event at the 2022 World Wrestling Championships held in Belgrade, Serbia.

References

External links 
 
 
 

1995 births
Living people
Egyptian female sport wrestlers
Olympic wrestlers of Egypt
Wrestlers at the 2016 Summer Olympics
Wrestlers at the 2020 Summer Olympics
Competitors at the 2019 African Games
African Games medalists in wrestling
African Games bronze medalists for Egypt
African Wrestling Championships medalists
Competitors at the 2022 Mediterranean Games
Mediterranean Games bronze medalists for Egypt
Mediterranean Games medalists in wrestling
21st-century Egyptian women
World Wrestling Championships medalists